Frank Padrón Nodarse (born 1958) is a Cuban film critic based in Havana and also host of the popular TV show De Nuestra América, in which he reviews movies for his Cuban audience. He has been a leading film critic in the country for over a quarter of a century.

Publications
 Poetry: 
 La profesión maldita, Santiago de Cuba. Editorial Oriente, 2004
 Las celadas de Narciso
 Más allá de la linterna
 "Prologue" to Con pies de gato, Miguel Barnet
 Miocardio culpable

References

Living people
Cuban film critics
1958 births